Ricky Ponting captained the Australian cricket team on their four Test tour of India in 2008–09. On a tour that was unsuccessful on a whole, the tourists lost the Test series 2–0 to an Indian side led by Anil Kumble and Mahendra Singh Dhoni, while they drew two warm-up matches against the Centre of Excellence (non-first-class match) and Indian Board President's XI. This was Ponting's first full tour of India as captain, after previously being injured for three of the four Tests when Australia last visited in 2004.

On previous Test tours of India in 1997–98, 2000–01 and 2004–05, Ponting struggled, especially against the off-spin from Harbhajan Singh, who had dismissed him on eight occasions in Tests. Ponting had only scored 172 runs in eight Tests and 14 innings in India, with a highest of 60—his only half-century in the country—and an average of 12.28, well below his career average of 58.53 prior to the series. However, in 11 home Tests against India, he had averaged 79.35.

Ponting's tour started well, scoring a half-century in the second tour match and a century in the opening Test. However, his performances diminished as his team began to struggle against an experienced Indian outfit. He managed only one other half-century for the series, totaling 266 runs at an average of 38, dropping his overall Test average to 57.58. In the final Test in Nagpur—in which Australia needed victory to level the series—Ponting was criticized for bowling part-time spin bowlers in an effort to increase the over rate, to avoid suspension and a fine. When the fast bowlers were re-introduced, the match was beyond Australia's grasp and India were eventual victors. These tactics were severely criticised in Australia.

Background and early tour

The series was the first time Ponting captained the Australians in a full Test series in India. He did not lead the Australian team to victory there in 2004–05 because he missed the first three Tests with injury. Adam Gilchrist took the Australians to a 2–1 victory. Australia, however, lost the fourth and final Test in Mumbai when Ponting returned. Nevertheless, this was Australia's first Test series win in India since 1969–70, in which Ponting made 11 and 12 on a controversial pitch.

Ponting and his team were under pressure leading into the series, following the spiteful confrontations during the Indian tour of Australia earlier in the year. He had also struggled in a previous three Test series during 2001, scoring 17 runs at 3.40. Ponting acknowledged prior to the series that he was keen to rectify his poor Test batting record in India, believed to be because of his weakness against spin bowling. Though, from 1 January 2004 up until the start of the first Test, Ponting scored 1510 runs and an average of 83.88 in 64 innings against spin bowling, thus being the only Australian to score more than 1,300 runs and average over 70.

First Test
Australia headed into the First Test at the M Chinnaswamy Stadium in Bangalore with two previous wins at the venue—in 1998 and 2004—and a draw. Meanwhile, India had not won at the venue since 1995, and had only four victories in 17 attempts—their worst Test win–loss ratio at home venues. 

Australia won the toss and batted, and Ponting was brought to the middle in the opening over, after Matthew Hayden was caught behind for a duck. He started slowly, scoring two from 17 balls, before driving Ishant Sharma for a boundary. Harbhajan Singh had already sent down 2.3 overs before he delivered his first ball to Ponting in the 17th over. The big screen at the ground flashed, "Ponting has been dismissed by Harbhajan eight times in Test cricket." Nevertheless, Ponting turned the first ball from his nemesis off his pads for a boundary. From then on Ponting increased his strike rate, reaching his half-century in 102 balls, when he hit Zaheer Khan for a boundary through cover. His partnership with Simon Katich ended on 166, when Katich was caught by Dhoni, after lasting more than 54 overs. He and Michael Clarke built on the good start with 60 runs in 24 overs, before Clarke was dismissed. Ponting brought up his century a short while later when cut Kumble through backward point for three. He eventually fell on 126 from 243 balls (13 fours), when he missed a sweep off Harbhajan, reducing Australia to 3/226.

After stumps, with Australia at 4/254, Ponting was happy with his performance, "I'm as pleased with that innings as I probably have been with any innings I've ever played," he said. "I'd played eight Tests here before with a highest score of 60, so I had some work to do. I had a point to prove to a few people as well. It was satisfying today." I've been working really hard," Ponting said on his technique. "I've made no secret of it, my record here has been poor. Today is one step in the right direction. It was nice to get some runs out there and put the team in a good position. But one innings doesn't make a tour. The other tours I've had here, apart from the last Test I played, I've batted at six, always coming in against spin and when the wicket has worn. One thing that stands out in my career is whenever I've been in early, with the team in a bit of trouble, I've managed to make runs."

Australia were bowled out for 430 shortly after tea on the second day. Michael Hussey scored his ninth Test century before the tourists tail folded. Australia had the hosts seven wickets down in their first innings—still more than 320 runs in arrears—before Harbhajan and Khan combined for an 80 run partnership late on day three.

In Australia's second innings, Ponting joined Katich in the 13th over, after Hayden was dismissed. Ponting lasted 34 balls, before he was caught a short mid-wicket from a Sharma slower ball on 17. Beforehand, the Australian captain was "targeted" by Harbhajan "with men crowded around the bat." Australia declared on 228 on the final day; however India survived, enforcing a draw.

Second Test
Prior to the Second Test starting on 17 October in Mohali, Australian opening batsman Phil Jaques (who did not play in the opening Test) was sent home after failing to overcome a back injury. He was replaced in the squad by Shaun Marsh, who opened the batting in the recently concluded One Day Internationals against the West Indies and had been the leading run-scorer in the 2008 Indian Premier League. Victorian fast-bowler Peter Siddle made his international debut, after Stuart Clark injured his elbow. Ponting himself was forced to take anti-inflammatory tablets, after surgery before the series.

Winning the toss and batting, India reached 5/311 by stumps on the opening day. India were bowled out for 469 on the second day, after Ganguly scored his 16th and last Test century. Hayden was bowled for a third-ball duck, while Ponting was trapped lbw by a Sharma off cutter for five, as Australia collapsed to 5/58 and then 8/144 in their first innings reply. Shane Watson and Brett Lee combined for 73 eight wicket partnership, helping Australia reach a meagre 268. In the home-side's second innings, Ponting was criticised for using part-timers against the free-scoring Indian batsmen after he was informed that he was five overs behind the required over rate, which is penalisable by a fine, or in severe instances, a ban to the captain. This meant that he was not able to use pace spearhead Brett Lee significantly. A long discussion between Lee and Ponting prompted media allegations of a team rift, something Ponting denied. "It seems like there are people trying to make a bit more of that than what it actually was," Ponting said after his team's defeat. "I made Brett aware he wasn't going to bowl first-thing in the morning. I let him know we were wanting to take pace off the ball." Where it fell down a bit is I didn't communicate those reasons to Brett at 11am when he wanted to bowl. I made it clear to him from that moment on of those reasons." After India declared on 3/314 with just over four sessions of play remaining, Australia were bowled out for 195 on the fifth morning, with Ponting's off stump knocked out of the ground by another Sharma off cutter for just 2, as India completed a 320 run victory.

Third Test
The Third Test in Delhi saw India amass 7/613 in its first innings, while Delhi smog—left over from Diwali festivals—created an unusual atmosphere. Gautam Gambhir and VVS Laxman both scored double centuries—the first time two batsmen have reached 200 in the same Test innings against Australia—and Ponting even resorted to bowling himself for two unsuccessful overs.

In reply Australia started strongly, with Ponting having to wait until 123 runs were scored before walking out to bat on the third day. After surviving a spell reverse-swing bowling from Ishant Sharma and Zaheer Khan, Ponting was bowled through the gate from a sharp turning delivery from part-time off-spinner Virender Sehwag. Ponting and out-of-form opener Matthew Hayden partnered for a cautious 79-run compilation, as both looked to survive on a pitch that was becoming lower and slower. Ponting was more cautious against Sharma than usual, scoring only nine from 26 balls from the tall right-armer quick. Nevertheless, he was more aggressive and assured against spinners Amit Mishra and Sehwag, where he scored 35 from 60 and 17 from 32 deliveries respectively. During the early stage of his innings, a swarm of bees interrupted the match when they forced the players and officials to lie on the ground, before they moved on. After surviving four dropped catches, Michael Clarke scored his eight Test century in Australia's highest Test score in India—577—as Sehwag took a career best five wickets in the absence of fellow spinners Harbhajan Singh and Kumble who left the field with a finger injury. India lost two late Indian wickets on the fourth evening and were reduced to 4/93 on the fifth morning; however the match ended in a tame draw, with the home side declaring on 5/208, setting Australia an unrealistic target of 245 in the final session. They finished on 31 without loss, before the match was declared a draw, resulting in Australia needing victory in the final Test to regain the Border-Gavaskar Trophy.

Fourth Test
With Australia needing to win the Fourth Test, Jason Krejza was selected for his Australian debut. The match was played at the Vidarbha Cricket Association Stadium in Nagpur, which was making its debut as an international venue. Previous matches in the city were played at the Vidarbha Cricket Association Ground and both teams were unsure how the pitch would play, as the match was also the first first-class match to be played at the stadium. Nevertheless, Ponting described said the pitch was grassless and hard as concrete. Ponting understood the importance of the match, "This is probably as big a Test match as a lot of us have played." He said. "Being 1–0 down with a match to play is a position that a lot of us haven't been in before. We pride ourselves on playing well in big games, and this is certainly a big game for us. There is a great opportunity for us to stand up, and play better cricket than we've played in the first three Test matches." Throughout the first three Tests, Australian bowlers struggled to take wickets, managing 38 wickets at an average of 53.61.

After losing the toss, Australia were sent into field. Their bowling attack again struggled to be effective, with Sachin Tendulkar scoring his 40th Test century (10th against Australia) and VVS Laxman compiling a slow 64. The only highlight for the Australian was Krejza's 8/215 from 43.5 overs, as India amassed 445. The off-spinners figures was the second best by an Australian on debut in Test history. Matthew Hayden and Simon Katich started quickly for Australia, reaching 32 in the seventh over, before Hayden was run-out. Ponting played freely, scoring 11 runs from the final three balls of an Ishant Sharma over. However, in the following over he was clean bowled for 24 (41 balls) by a Harbhajan Singh delivery that spun and left him cramped for room while trying to cut. This was the tenth occasion he had been dismissed by Harbhajan in Tests.

On the fourth afternoon of the Fourth Test, the Indian batting collapsed, and Australia had an opportunity to bowl them out and chase a target of around 250–300 after the tea break. However, the Australians were a long way behind on their over rate, so in order to avoid a one match suspension, Ponting chose to bowl their part-time spinners and medium pacers such as Michael Clarke, Cameron White and Mike Hussey (who were all unsuccessful in capturing a wicket), as they took less time. In the meantime, captain MS Dhoni and Harbhajan both added half centuries. This drew strong criticism from many commentators, who suggested that their faster bowlers, who had been responsible for the collapse, could have bowled from a shorter run-up. When the fast bowlers were reintroduced, the last four wickets fell quickly. This left Australia with 382 runs for victory and Ponting fell cheaply after attempting to take a quick single down the ground and being run out by a direct hit from Mishra at the non-striker's end. Australia lost by 172 runs to cede the series 2–0. In the first innings, Ponting became Harbhajan's 300th Test wicket. He ended the series with 264 runs at 37.71. While below his career standards, it was substantially better than his previous Test efforts in India.

Ponting escaped without suspension for slow over rates, although he received a fine. Nevertheless, he failed to redress the matter during the subsequent home series against New Zealand, when match referee Chris Broad dealt a second successive fine for being three overs behind in the First Test. Ponting was subsequently stripped of thirty per cent of his A$12,750 match fee, twice the punishment of his team-mates in accordance with International Cricket Council rules for captains. Australia were largely untroubled by New Zealand, sweeping both Tests. Ponting scored only 100 runs at 33.33.

Aftermath
Ponting was severely criticised for using the part-time bowlers ahead of his frontline men. Respected media analyst Peter Roebuck wrote in The Sydney Morning Herald and The Age, "In one of the most baffling displays of captaincy seen in the long and proud history of Australian cricket, Ricky Ponting has denied his side a deserved chance of securing a famous victory. Rather than pressing home an advantage secured by dint of outstanding swing bowling and inspired spin in a fraught and fascinating afternoon session, the Australian captain preferred to use part-timers. Presumably, it was an attempt to improve an ailing over rate. Perhaps he was worried about missing the next match. Both issues pale into insignificance besides trying with every power at his disposal to retain the Border-Gavaskar Trophy. There was a match to win. To an almost bizarre degree, Ponting lost the plot."

"Over 131 years, 404 men have been accorded to the honour of wearing the baggy green cap, arguably the most significant and recognizable symbol in Australian team sport," wrote Australian Broadcasting Corporation's (ABC) Glenn Mitchell. "Many today would have hung their head in sadness while others would have turned and in their grave. What happened today in Nagpur was at odds with team sport is all about. May it never be allowed to happen again." The barrage of Ponting's decision continued, with then Australian leading Test run-scorer (since overtaken by Ponting) saying on Fox Sports, "I don't know what to make of this. They go into the tea break on a high and come out worrying about over-rates. I am glad Ricky can't read my mind right now because he is not going to like it." Ponting later admitted that Border's comment was the one that hurt him the most, despite News Limited reporter Jon Pierik describing his captaincy as a "joke", while Malcolm Conn from The Australian wrote it was his "worst day as national captain". Indian newspapers also continued with the criticism, with some suggesting Ponting put himself before the team. Ponting angrily responded to such comments at the post-Test media conference.

Notes

References
 

2008–09 Australian cricket season